Christian Gheorghe Mititelu (b. Bucharest, April 11, 1944) is a Romanian journalist. He was the director of Romanian department of the BBC.

Education and career
He attended Polytechnic University of Bucharest between 1962–1967. Then he worked as engineer for F.E.A. Bucharest (1968-1969) and G.E.C. Automation Paris (1970-1971).

From 1972 until 2008, he worked for BBC World Service, first as redactor (1972-1984) and then as director of Romanian section of BBC (1984-1991 and 1993-2004). Also, Christian Mititelu worked for the BBC until August 2008.

He is also the president of the Civic Alliance of Romania and a member of the Romanian Press League. Mititelu is a member of the National Audiovisual Council of Romania as well. He was appointed in this position by the Romanian Government in October 2008.

He is married and has two children.

Works
 Viaţa lui Corneliu Coposu

Honours
  Romanian Royal Family: 57th Knight of the Royal Decoration of the Cross of the Romanian Royal House

Notes

External links
 http://www.cna.ro/-English-.html
 https://web.archive.org/web/20081203120839/http://www.realitatea.net/jurnalistul-ion-cristoiu-a-mai-pierdut-un-proces-de-calomnie_146167.html
 
 https://web.archive.org/web/20110822025122/http://www.cna.ro/IMG/pdf/Christian_Mititelu_declaratie_interese_nov2008.pdf

1944 births
Living people
Journalists from Bucharest
Politehnica University of Bucharest alumni
Romanian textbook writers
Romanian activists
BBC people
Romanian dissidents
Romanian expatriates in France
Romanian radio personalities
Romanian biographers
Male biographers
Romanian civil servants
Romanian essayists
Romanian human rights activists
20th-century Romanian historians
Romanian memoirists
Romanian translators
20th-century translators
Male essayists
20th-century essayists
20th-century Romanian male writers
21st-century Romanian historians